Sally McConnell-Ginet (born 1938) is Professor Emerita of Linguistics at Cornell University. She is known for her work on the language of gender and sexuality.

Education and career
McConnell-Ginet earned degrees in philosophy and mathematics before turning to linguistics, receiving a PhD from the University of Rochester in 1973. She joined the faculty of Cornell University in 1973, with a dual appointment in women's studies and philosophy. She went on to serve as director of Women's Studies and founding co-director of Cognitive Studies, and chair of Modern Languages and Linguistics, as well as the later Department of Linguistics.

McConnell-Ginet has served as president of the International Gender and Language Association and of the Linguistic Society of America (LSA). In 2008, she was elected a fellow of the LSA and of the American Association for the Advancement of Science.

Personal life
McConnell-Ginet is an avid swimmer. She swam across Lake Cayuga for a charity event the day before her 75th birthday in 2013. She is also involved in local theatre, and teaches math at a maximum security prison as part of the Cornell Prison Education Program. McConnell-Ginet is married to Cornell University Professor Emeritus Carl Ginet.

Selected publications

References

External links
Sally McConnell-Ginet faculty page at Cornell University

Linguists from the United States
American women academics
Cornell University faculty
Living people
Sociolinguists
University of Rochester alumni
Fellows of the American Association for the Advancement of Science
Fellows of the Linguistic Society of America
Linguistic Society of America presidents
Women linguists
1938 births
21st-century American women